Gordon McTavish (born June 3, 1954) is a Canadian former professional ice hockey centre. He was drafted in the first round, 15th overall, by the Montreal Canadiens in the 1974 NHL amateur draft.

He was also drafted by the Winnipeg Jets of the World Hockey Association. He played eleven games in his National Hockey League career: one with the St. Louis Blues in the 1978–79 season and ten with the Jets (after the team joined the NHL) in the 1979–80 season.

Career statistics

Regular season and playoffs

External links
 
1974 NHL amateur draft - Gord McTavish

1954 births
Living people
Canadian expatriate ice hockey players in the United States
Canadian ice hockey centres
Ice hockey people from Ontario
Montreal Canadiens draft picks
National Hockey League first-round draft picks
Nova Scotia Voyageurs players
St. Louis Blues players
Salt Lake Golden Eagles (CHL) players
SC Rapperswil-Jona Lakers players
Sportspeople from Guelph
Sudbury Wolves players
Tulsa Oilers (1964–1984) players
Winnipeg Jets (1979–1996) players
Winnipeg Jets (WHA) draft picks